Patrick Ruthven may refer to:

 Patrick Ruthven, 3rd Lord Ruthven (c. 1520–1566), Scottish politician
 Patrick Ruthven, 1st Earl of Forth (c. 1573–1651), Scottish general and diplomat

See also
 Patrick Hore-Ruthven (1913–1942), British soldier and poet
 Ruthven (disambiguation)